Chris Spence may refer to:

 Chris Spence (educator) (born 1962), Canadian educator, author, and former football player
 Chris Spence (journalist) (born 1970), New Zealand researcher into climate change
 Chris Spence (politician) (born 1975), Australian politician with the One Nation and Liberal parties

See also
 Christopher Spencer (disambiguation)